Erin Brockovich is a 2000  American biographical legal drama film directed by Steven Soderbergh and written by Susannah Grant. The film is a dramatization of the true story of Erin Brockovich, portrayed by Julia Roberts, who fought against the energy corporation Pacific Gas and Electric Company (PG&E) regarding its culpability for the Hinkley groundwater contamination incident. The film was a box-office success, and gained a positive critical reaction.

The film received five nominations at the 73rd Academy Awards, including Best Picture, Best Director for Soderbergh, Best Original Screenplay for Grant, Best Actress for Roberts (which she won), and Best Supporting Actor for Finney. Roberts also won a BAFTA award, a Golden Globe, a Screen Actors Guild Award, and multiple critics awards. Soderbergh received a separate Best Director nomination for Traffic, another film released that same year, which he won. Early in the film, the real Erin Brockovich has a cameo appearance as a waitress named Julia; the real Ed Masry also appears in the same scene.

Plot
In 1993, Erin Brockovich is an unemployed single mother of three children who has recently been injured in a traffic accident with a doctor and is suing him. Her lawyer, Ed Masry, expects to win, but Erin's confrontational courtroom behavior under cross-examination loses her the case, and Ed will not return her phone calls afterwards. One day, he arrives at work to find her in the office, apparently working. She says that he told her things would work out and they did not, and that she needed a job. She asks Ed for a job, which he reluctantly gives her.

Erin is given files for a real estate case where the Pacific Gas and Electric Company (PG&E) is offering to purchase the home of Donna Jensen in Hinkley, California. Erin is surprised to see medical records in a real estate file. Briefly asking permission to investigate, she visits Donna, who explains that she had simply kept all her PG&E correspondence together. Donna appreciates PG&E's help: she has had several tumors and her husband has Hodgkin's lymphoma, but PG&E has always provided a doctor at their own expense. Erin asks why they would do that, and Donna replies, "because of the chromium". Erin begins digging into the case and finds evidence that the groundwater in Hinkley is seriously contaminated with carcinogenic hexavalent chromium, while PG&E has been telling Hinkley residents that they use a safer form of chromium. After a week, Erin returns to the office to report and is told she has been fired for missing a week of work.

Later, Ed realizes what was happening when a professor Erin consulted tries to phone her back. He visits Erin to ask for her research, and accepts her demand to be rehired in return, with a raise. Continuing her research over time, she visits many Hinkley residents and gains their trust. Ed and Erin hold a barbecue in order to speak to many of the residents and explain to them what PG&E has been trying to get away with. Erin and Ed find numerous medical problems in Hinkley, and that virtually everyone has been treated by PG&E's doctors, who have led them to believe their issues are unrelated to the "safe" chromium. The Jensens' claim for compensation ultimately becomes a major class action lawsuit. Unfortunately, Ed explains that all direct evidence is linked solely to PG&E Hinkley, rather than PG&E corporate headquarters: thus, PG&E corporate can deny any knowledge of what's happening in Hinkley.

Knowing that PG&E could slow any settlement for years through delays and appeals, Ed decides to pursue binding arbitration rather than a trial by jury, but PG&E will only agree to arbitration if 90% of the plaintiffs agree. During a town hall meeting with the Hinkley residents, Ed goes over the plan, struggling to explain the virtue of arbitration versus a 10–15 year battle in court. Eventually everyone in attendance agrees, and over the next several days Ed and Erin persuade all of the remaining plaintiffs to go along.

One night, at a bar in Hinkley, Erin unexpectedly meets a man who seemed to be awkwardly flirting with her at the last two Hinkley events. After some uncomfortable conversation the man identifies himself as Charles Embry, a former PG&E employee who in his job was ordered to "destroy documents". Erin realizes Charles has been trying to approach her to confide in her, and finally hears his story. Charles and his cousin were both employees with PG&E Hinkley, and his cousin has just died painfully from the poison. He goes on to explain that PG&E tasked him with destroying documents, but, "as it turns out, I wasn't a very good employee".

Embry gives Erin the documents, including a 1966 memo proving corporate headquarters knew the water was contaminated with hexavalent chromium, and advised PG&E Hinkley to keep this secret. The judge orders PG&E to pay a settlement amount of $333 million to be distributed among the plaintiffs, $5 million of which goes to the Jensens. Erin brings her boyfriend with her when she tells them about it, and he is happy when he understands what it was all for.

In the aftermath, Ed hands Erin her bonus payment for the case, but warns her he has changed the amount. She assumes that he has decreased it, begins complaining loudly that she deserves more respect, but is astonished to find that he has increased the amount and paid her 2 million dollars.

Cast

 Julia Roberts as Erin Brockovich
 Albert Finney as Edward L. Masry
 Aaron Eckhart as George, Erin's biker boyfriend
 Marg Helgenberger as Donna Jensen
 Tracey Walter as Charles Embry
 Peter Coyote as Kurt Potter
 Cherry Jones as Pamela Duncan
 Scarlett Pomers as Shanna Jensen
 Conchata Ferrell as Brenda, Mr. Masry's secretary
 Erin Brockovich as Waitress Julia
 Michael Harney as Pete Jensen
 Veanne Cox as Theresa Dallavale
 Scotty Leavenworth as Matthew Brown
 Gemmenne de la Peña as Katie Brown
 Gina Gallego as Ms. Sanchez, a PG & E attorney
 T. J. Thyne as David Foil
 Valente Rodriguez as Donald
 Jamie Harrold as Scott
 Edward L. Masry as Diner Patron (uncredited)
 Manning Bailey as Party Extra (uncredited)

Production
The film was shot over eleven weeks, five weeks of that taking place in Ventura, California.

Erin Brockovich performed well with test audiences but executives at Universal Studios were worried that audiences would be turned off by the title character's use of profane language.

Reception

Box office
Erin Brockovich was released on March 17, 2000, in 2,848 theaters and grossed $28.1 million on its opening weekend. It had the second-highest March opening weekend upon release, after Liar Liar. This was also the second-highest opening weekend for a Julia Roberts film, behind Runaway Bride. The film went on to make $125.6 million in North America and $130.7 million in the rest of the world for a worldwide total of $256.3 million.

Critical response
On review website Rotten Tomatoes Erin Brockovich holds an approval rating of 85% based on 150 reviews, with an average rating of 7.50/10. The critics consensus reads, "Taking full advantage of Julia Roberts's considerable talent and appeal, Erin Brockovich overcomes a few character and plot issues to deliver a smart, thoughtful, and funny legal drama." On Metacritic, the film has a weighted score of 73 out of 100 based on 36 critics, indicating "generally favorable reviews." Audiences polled by CinemaScore gave the film an average grade of "A" on an A+ to F scale.

In his review for The New York Observer, Andrew Sarris wrote, "We get the best of independent cinema and the best of mainstream cinema all in one package. Erin Brockovich, like Wonder Boys right before it, makes the year 2000 seem increasingly promising for movies". Newsweek magazine's David Ansen began his review with, "Julia Roberts is flat-out terrific in Erin Brockovich." Furthermore, he wrote, "Roberts has wasted her effervescence on many paltry projects, but she hits the jackpot this time. Erin, single mother of three, a former Miss Wichita who improbably rallies a community to take on a multi-billion-dollar corporation, is the richest role of her career, simultaneously showing off her comic, dramatic and romantic chops". Rolling Stone magazine's Peter Travers wrote, "Roberts shows the emotional toll on Erin as she tries to stay responsible to her children and to a job that has provided her with a first taste of self-esteem". In his review for Entertainment Weekly, Owen Gleiberman gave the film a "B+" rating and wrote, "It's a delight to watch Roberts, with her flirtatious sparkle and undertow of melancholy, ricochet off Finney's wonderfully jaded, dry-as-beef-jerky performance as the beleaguered career attorney who knows too much about the loopholes of his profession to have much faith left in it". Sight & Sound magazine's Andrew O'Hehir wrote, "Perhaps the best thing about this relaxed and supremely engaging film (for my money the best work either the director or his star has ever done) is that even its near-fairytale resolution doesn't offer a magical transformation". In her review for The Village Voice, Amy Taubin wrote, "What's pretty original about the picture is that it focuses an investigative drama based on a true story around a comic performance".

However, film critic Roger Ebert gave the film a two-star review, writing, "There is obviously a story here, but Erin Brockovich doesn't make it compelling. The film lacks focus and energy, the character development is facile and thin". In his review for The New York Times, A.O. Scott wrote, "After proving, for about 40 minutes, what a marvelous actress she can be, Ms. Roberts spends the next 90 content to be a movie star. As the movie drags on, her performance swells to bursting with moral vanity and phony populism". Time magazine's Richard Corliss found the film to be "slick, grating and false. We bet it makes a bundle".

Accolades
Julia Roberts became the first actress to win an Academy Award, BAFTA Award, Critics' Choice Movie Award, Golden Globe Award, National Board of Review Award, and Screen Actors Guild Award for a single performance.  Steven Soderbergh was nominated for (Best Director) that year for both Erin Brockovich and Traffic; he won with Traffic.

American Film Institute recognition:
 AFI's 100 Years...100 Heroes & Villains:
 Erin Brockovich – No. 31
 AFI's 100 Years...100 Cheers – No. 73

Accuracy
On her website, Brockovich says the film is "probably 98% accurate". While the general facts of the story are accurate, there are some minor discrepancies between actual events and the movie, as well as a number of controversial and disputed issues more fundamental to the case. In the film, Erin Brockovich appears to deliberately use her cleavage to seduce the water board attendant to allow her to access the documents. Brockovich has acknowledged that her cleavage may have had an influence, but denies consciously trying to influence individuals in this way. In the film, Ed Masry represents Erin Brockovich in the car crash case. In reality, it was his law partner, Jim Vititoe. Brockovich had never been Miss Wichita; she had been Miss Pacific Coast. According to Brockovich, this detail was deliberately changed by Soderbergh as he thought it was "cute" to have her be beauty queen of the region from which she came. The "not so good employee" that met Brockovich in the bar was Chuck Ebersohl. He told Erin about the documents that he and Lillian Melendez had been tasked by PG&E to destroy.

Jorge Halaby, played by Aaron Eckhart in the film, along with Brockovich's ex-husband Shawn Brown alleged that she had an affair with Masry. They also attempted to file a lawsuit against her for $310,000. Halaby was arrested and the lawyer John Jeffrey Reiner was suspended from practicing, convicted of extortion, and later disbarred.

The scientific accuracy of the film has been questioned. According to The New York Times, scientists have suggested that their profession would have more rationally and scientifically evaluated the medical evidence that inspired Brockovich.

Notes

References

External links

 
 
 
 
 
 
 Erin Brockovich-Ellis' official site
 Story behind Erin Brockovich with pictures and primary sources from the actual case on which the film is based

2000 films
2000s American films
2000s English-language films
2000 drama films
2000 biographical drama films
2000s feminist films
2000s legal films
American biographical drama films
American feminist films
American legal drama films
BAFTA winners (films)
Environmental films
Works about consumer protection
Films about lawyers
Films about single parent families
Films featuring a Best Actress Academy Award-winning performance
Films featuring a Best Drama Actress Golden Globe-winning performance
Films set in 1993
Films set in California
Films shot in California
Films about activists
Pacific Gas and Electric Company
Poisoning in film
Films scored by Thomas Newman
Films with screenplays by Susannah Grant
Films produced by Danny DeVito
Films directed by Steven Soderbergh
Universal Pictures films
Columbia Pictures films